Mario Preskar (born January 12, 1984) is a former Croatian professional heavyweight boxer. He trained at Leonardo Boxing Gym in Zagreb with his trainer Leonard Pijetraj.

Amateur career 
Preskar was born in Zagreb, Croatia. He began boxing at the age of 9 at the urging of his father Željko, a cab driver. Preskar became a seven-time Croatian national champion, his final amateur record was 45-5.

Professional career 

Preskar started his professional career in 2003, at only 19, signing a contract with the world-famous boxing manager Don King. King and Preskar parted ways in September 2008, with King reportedly unwilling to accept new contract terms put forward by Preskar and Pijetraj, who demanded more frequent fights. Preskar founded new opportunities with K2 Promotions, run by the Klitschko brothers.

In his 19th professional fight against Maksym Pedyura on June 27, 2009 in Lviv, Preskar was ahead throughout most of the match, but was knocked down twice in the last round. After the final bell, he collapsed and was immediately taken to hospital. The fight was declared a draw.

Preskar ascribed the incident to extreme exhaustion, due to high temperature and insufficient ventilation in the hall. In August 2009, he announced an indefinite break from boxing, citing lack of motivation. In May 2010 he collapsed while training, and was diagnosed with epilepsy.

As of 2019, Preskar is working as a boxing coach and a boxing commentator for RTL Televizija.

References

External links
 
 Leonardo Boxing Gym

1984 births
Living people
Sportspeople from Zagreb
Croatian male boxers
Heavyweight boxers